Henry Melvill Napier (2 May 1854 – 18 December 1940) was a Scottish rugby union international who represented Scotland in the 1876–77 Home Nations rugby union matches, 1877–78 Home Nations rugby union matches, 1878–79 Home Nations rugby union matches and 1879–80 Home Nations rugby union matches. Napier was also a noted engineer and shipbuilder.

Rugby Union career

Amateur career

Napier played as a forward for Glasgow University RFC and West of Scotland.

Provincial career

He represented Glasgow District against Edinburgh District in the 5 December 1874 match.

He also represented the West of Scotland District.

International career

Although he gained Glasgow district cap while with the university, he gained his Scotland caps while with West of Scotland.

Shipbuilding
Napier was an engineer and shipbuilder.

As a founder of Napier and Miller, a shipbuilding firm based first at Yoker, Glasgow - though then part of West Dunbartonshire - in 1898;  then moving to Old Kilpatrick, West Dunbartonshire in 1906.

The company built over 120 ships including warships for the British Navy and passenger ships for the USA and Canada. It also assembled RAF BE2 biplanes. The company went bust in 1931 during the Great Depression.

Family

Henry Napier's son Ian Napier was a Scottish World War 1 flying ace.

References

1854 births
1940 deaths
Scottish rugby union players
Scotland international rugby union players
Rugby union forwards
Glasgow District (rugby union) players
Glasgow University RFC players
Rugby union players from Glasgow
Scottish shipbuilders
West of Scotland District (rugby union) players
West of Scotland FC players
Blues Trial players